Gaudiya Nritya or Gôur̤īyo Nrityô, is a Bengali dance tradition. It originates from Gauda, also known as Gaur, in Bengal.

It has been reconstructed by Mahua Mukherjee. It is recognised as an Indian classical dance by Ministry of Culture, not recognized by Sangeet Natak Akademi ,but study of it is eligible for scholarships from the Ministry of Culture of India. Scholarly reception of the reconstruction ranges from caution to skepticism.

References

External links

 www.gaudiyanritya.org
 Video of Gaudiya Nritya performance

Bengali culture
Dances of India